Hoplia coerulea is a species of scarabaeid beetle belonging to the subfamily Rutelinae.
This beetle can be found in Southwest Europe, including France, Spain and Switzerland. Males are bright blue,  females are brownish.

References

 Hoplia coerulea at Fauna Europaea

Rutelinae
Beetles of Europe
Beetles described in 1773
Taxa named by Dru Drury